Sheikh Ejaz Ahmad is a Pakistani politician and businessman who is the founder of Ejaz Group. He was the member of the Senate of Pakistan from 1985 to 1988.

Ejaz Group
The group owns following businesses:
 Ejaz Textile Mills
 Ejaz Spinning Mills
 Lake City Holdings

References

Living people
Members of the Senate of Pakistan
Pakistani company founders
Pakistani industrialists
Chinioti people
Year of birth missing (living people)